Liopagus simplex is a species of harvestmen in a monotypic genus in the family Sclerosomatidae.

References

Harvestmen
Monotypic arachnid genera